Affair at the Grand Hotel is a 1929 Czech-German silent film directed by Domenico Gambino, Edmund Heuberger and Theodor Pištěk.

Cast

References

Bibliography

External links

1929 films
Czech silent feature films
Films of the Weimar Republic
German silent feature films
Films directed by Edmund Heuberger
Films directed by Domenico Gambino
German black-and-white films
Czech black-and-white films
1920s Czech-language films